KPPP-LP (88.1 FM) is a radio station licensed to serve the community of Fargo, North Dakota. The station is owned by The People's Press Project. It airs a world ethnic radio format.

The station was assigned the KPPP-LP call letters by the Federal Communications Commission on February 5, 2014.

References

External links
 Official Website
 

PPP-LP
PPP-LP
Radio stations established in 2015
2015 establishments in North Dakota
Cass County, North Dakota